Mišinci may refer to:

 Mišinci, Bosnia and Herzegovina, a village near Derventa
 Mišinci, Croatia, a village near Žakanje